{{Infobox military person
| name          = Nikolai Mikhailovich Kharlamov
| image         = Адмирал Харламов.jpg
| native_name   = Никола́й Миха́йлович Харла́мов
| birth_date    = 
| birth_place   = Zhukovka, Bryansky Uyezd, Oryol Governorate, Russian Empire(now Zhukovka, Bryansk Oblast, Russia)
| death_date    = 
| death_place   = Moscow, Russian SFSR, USSR(now Russia)
| battles       = World War II
| commands      = Destroyer DzerzhinskyDestroyer Bodry]]Cruiser Voroshilov8th Fleet, Baltic FleetBaltic Fleet
| awards        = Order of Lenin
| serviceyears  = 1922  1971
}}
Nikolai Mikhailovich Kharlamov (19 December 1905 – 9 April 1983) was a Soviet military leader and admiral.

Early life
Kharlamov was born in the city of Zhukovka in the Oryol Governorate on 1905.

Military career
In 1922, he joined the Soviet Navy and in 1925, he became member of the Communist Party of the Soviet Union. From 1924 to 1928, he was a student at the Naval Political School Named After S.G. Roshal and Naval School Named After M. V. Frunze.

From October 1928, Kharlamov began his service in the Black Sea Fleet where he served as watch officer and supply manager of the destroyer 
Dzerzhinsky, artilleryman and assistant commander of the destroyer Frunze, and commander of the destroyers Dzerzhinsky, [[Soviet destroyer Bodry (1936)|Bodry and cruiser Voroshilov. In February 1938, he was appointed as Chief of Staff of the Black Sea Fleet.

He graduated from advanced training courses for senior officers at the Naval Academy named K. E. Voroshilov and Naval Department of the Military Academy of the General Staff in 1941. From April 1941, he served as head of the Combat Training Directorate of the Navy.

World War II
Following the outbreak of Operation Barbarossa in June 1941, Kharlamov was sent to Great Britain and the United States as part of the Soviet military mission led by General Filipp Golikov. Already in London on 20 July 1941, he was appointed naval attaché at the Soviet Embassy in Great Britain and remained in this post until October 1944.

Being an assertive, but tactful person, he managed to establish effective interaction with the British military circles and even with the leadership of the MI6 and provided the Soviet leadership with a significant amount of intelligence information.

Kharlamov carried out communication with the British Admiralty, including the organization of Arctic convoys to the Soviet Artic port city of Murmansk. He made a significant contribution to the discovery of the opening of Second Front in Europe and participated in Operation Overlord while being onboard one of the ships participating in the operation.

From 20 November 1944, he served as head of department and deputy head of the Main Naval Staff of the Navy.

Post war
After the war, Kharlamov served as deputy chief of the General Staff of the Armed Forces for Naval Forces from 1946 to 1950 and commander of the 8th Fleet of the Baltic Fleet from 1950 to 1954. In July 1956, he was appointed as head of the Naval Department of the Higher Military Academy Named After K. E. Voroshilov. From November 1956 to May 1959, he served as commander of the Baltic Fleet.

In May 1959, he was sent to China where he served as a military specialist in the People's Liberation Army Navy. From 1961 to 1971, he worked in a responsible position in the Central Office of the Navy and at the same time served as chairman of the Naval Scientific and Technical Committee of the Navy. Kharlamov retired from military service in August 1971.

He also served as people's deputy at the 4th and 5th convocation sessions of the Supreme Soviet of the Soviet Union from 1954 to 1962.

Later life
Kharlamov died on 9 April 1983, and was buried at the Kuntsevo Cemetery in Moscow.

Dates of rank
Komandarm 1st rank, Soviet Navy: 15 December 1936 
Rear Admiral, Soviet Navy: 4 June 1940
Vice Admiral, Soviet Navy: 21 July 1944
Admiral, Soviet Navy: 11 May 1949

Awards and decorations

His awards include:
Soviet Union

Foreign

Other honors
An  of the Soviet and Russian Navy Admiral Kharlamov was commmisoned in honor of him on 1 April 1990 and was assigned to the Northern Fleet. The destroyer was decommissioned on 2 December 2020.

References

1905 births
1983 deaths
People from Zhukovsky District, Bryansk Oblast
People from Bryansky Uyezd
Communist Party of the Soviet Union members
Fourth convocation members of the Supreme Soviet of the Soviet Union
Fifth convocation members of the Supreme Soviet of the Soviet Union
Soviet admirals
Soviet military attachés
Soviet naval attachés
Soviet expatriates in China
Soviet expatriates in the United Kingdom
Soviet expatriates in the United States
Soviet military personnel of World War II
Recipients of the Order of Lenin
Recipients of the Order of Nakhimov, 1st class
Recipients of the Order of the Cross of Grunwald, 3rd class
Recipients of the Order of the Red Banner
Recipients of the Order of the Red Banner of Labour
Recipients of the Order of the Red Star
Recipients of the Order of Ushakov, 1st class
Burials at Kuntsevo Cemetery